is a former Japanese football player. He is the support coach J2 League club of Blaublitz Akita.

Playing career
Kumabayashi was born in Asahikawa, Hokkaido on June 23, 1981, and raised in Akita, Akita. After graduating from high school, he joined J1 League club Júbilo Iwata in 2000. However he could not play at all in the match in the club with many Japan national team players. In June 2002, he moved to J2 League club Shonan Bellmare. He became a regular player as defensive midfielder immediately and played many matches until 2003. However his opportunity to play decreased in 2004. In 2005, he moved to J1 club Yokohama F. Marinos. However he could not play many matches. In 2006, he moved to J2 club Vegalta Sendai. He became a regular player as defensive midfielder. However his opportunity to play decreased in 2006. In July 2006, he moved to J2 club Tokushima Vortis and played many matches as regular player. In 2008, he moved to J2 club Thespa Kusatsu. He played many matches as regular player in 5 seasons until 2012. In 2013, he moved to Japan Football League club Blaublitz Akita based in his local. He played as regular player and the club was promoted to new league J3 League from 2014. He retired end of 2015 season.

Club statistics

References

External links

1981 births
Living people
Association football people from Akita Prefecture
Japanese footballers
J1 League players
J2 League players
J3 League players
Japan Football League players
Júbilo Iwata players
Shonan Bellmare players
Yokohama F. Marinos players
Vegalta Sendai players
Tokushima Vortis players
Thespakusatsu Gunma players
Blaublitz Akita players
Association football midfielders